Election to the Senate were held on November 11, 1941 in the Philippines.  The Senate was re-instituted after amendments to the constitution restored the bicameral legislature last used in 1935.

The elected senators would start to serve only in 1945 as they were not able to take office on December 30, 1941 as Imperial Japan invaded the country on December 8, 1941 at the onset of World War II.

Electoral system 
The electorate voted with plurality-at-large voting for the first time for the Senate; the voters have the option of writing the party name on the ballot and all 24 candidates from the party receive votes; another option is by voting individually for each candidate. Also, the former senatorial districts were not used; instead voting was done nationwide as one at-large district. The succeeding Senate elections would be held every two years, with eight seats to be disputed in every election.

The next election was to be on 1943, but due to the intervention of World War II, no elections were until 1946, where the seats supposedly up in 1943 and 1945 were disputed. The winners of the 1941 election were not seated until 1945. In the intervening years, the Second Philippine Republic, a Japanese puppet state, put up a unicameral National Assembly.

Results

Per candidate 
While the tally of votes have been lost in history, some sources tell where each candidate finished in the tally. Claro M. Recto finished first, while Mariano Jesus Cuenco finished fifth, and Vicente Rama finished 16th.

Not all candidates of the same party finished with the same number of votes, as some voted individually per candidate, instead of just writing the party name, and some didn't complete the 24 names if they did choose to vote individually per candidate.

Per party

See also
Commission on Elections
Politics of the Philippines
Philippine elections

References

External links
 The Philippine Presidency Project
 Official website of the Commission on Elections

1941
Election, Senate